Willy Bo Richardson (born June 8, 1974) is an American artist. Richardson is regarded as one of many contemporary painters revisiting late Modernism.  Describing his paintings as “philosophy in motion,” Richardson paints vertical strokes of color. He exhibits his paintings internationally.

Early life and education
His father is a master wood-worker and artist/painter, and his mother was a counselor and founded the first mediation center in Santa Fe. He studied at UW Madison and received a BA from University of Texas at Austin. While at UT Austin, he counted Peter Saul and Linda Montano among his teachers.

Living in Philadelphia in 1997, he was writing and painting. Richardson jokes, "I wrote a really bad coming of age novel, and the next year I checked myself in to graduate school for painting at Pratt Institute" in Brooklyn. He received an MFA there in 2000. He and his wife lived in New York City for a decade. He worked as a painting technician at Cooper Union from 2001-2007.

Career
Richardson taught painting at Santa Fe University of Art and Design from 2009-2016. In 2011 his work was included in the exhibition curated by Stephanie Buhmann at Jason McCoy Gallery in New York titled, "70 Years of Abstract Painting – Excerpts".  The show assembled works by a selection of modern and contemporary painters, including Josef Albers, Hans Hofmann and Jackson Pollock. In 2012 he showed a body of work in the exhibition "Watercolors”" at the Phillips de Pury headquarters in Chelsea New York. In 2014 Richardson was selected to be one of the SITE Santa Fe SPREAD finalists. His work and vision was featured on the PBS weekly arts series ¡COLORES!. Richardson's painting titled "Number 1," 1999 was acquired by the Albuquerque Museum of Art and History in 2018. He was a guest artist at the Tamarind Institute at the University of New Mexico in 2019. Richardson is represented by Richard Levy Gallery in Albuquerque.

Work

Richardson paints large scale canvases in vertical fluid strokes of bold color. Influenced by Robert Irwin’s large scrim installation in 1998 titled Prologue: x 18³ at the Dia Art Foundation on 22nd street, Richardson set out to "influence space" with paintings. Richardson states about his paintings, "I found myself not chasing current trends, but instead found meaning in looking for underlying currents of value... I found a loadstone of sorts, and it’s as simple as finding true north, or one’s own heartbeat."

References

External links
 
 Wright, Margaret. Painters Point the Way at Richard Levy Gallery Adobe Airstream, August–September 2014 Edition.
 Frederick Hammersley Foundation. Willy Bo Richardson, The Impressionists, Regional Theater, Jack Ross PBS ¡COLORES!
  Patti LaSalle-Hopkins. On the Line New Mexico Magazine, April 2018.

1974 births
Living people
20th-century American painters
American male painters
21st-century American painters
21st-century American male artists
Abstract painters
Artists from Santa Fe, New Mexico
Painters from New Mexico
New Mexico
People from New Mexico by occupation
Artists from New Mexico
20th-century American male artists